Lecanicillium is a genus of fungi in the order Hypocreales and is described as anamorphic Cordycipitaceae; 21 species are currently described.  Some of these entomopathogenic fungus species were previously widely known as Verticillium lecanii (Zimmerman) Viegas. This genus was first named and introduced by Rasoul Zare (IRIPP) and Walter Gams (CBS).

Species
The IndexFungorum records the following species:
 Lecanicillium acerosum W. Gams, H.C. Evans & Zare 2001
 Lecanicillium antillanum (R.F. Castañeda & G.R.W. Arnold) Zare & W. Gams 2001
 Lecanicillium aphanocladii Zare & W. Gams 2001
 Lecanicillium aranearum (Petch) Zare & W. Gams 2001
 Lecanicillium araneicola Sukarno & Kurihara 2009
 Lecanicillium attenuatum Zare & W. Gams 2001
 Lecanicillium dimorphum (J.D. Chen) Zare & W. Gams 2001
 Lecanicillium evansii Zare & W. Gams 2001
 Lecanicillium flavidum (W. Gams & Zaayen) W. Gams & Zare 2008
 Lecanicillium fungicola (Preuss) Zare & W. Gams 2008; Anamorphic Cordycipitaceae
 Lecanicillium fungicola var. aleophilum (W. Gams & Zaayen) W. Gams & Zare 2008
 Lecanicillium fungicola var. fungicola (Preuss) Zare & W. Gams 2008
 Lecanicillium fusisporum (W. Gams) Zare & W. Gams 2001
 Lecanicillium kalimantanense Kurihara & Sukarno 2009
 Lecanicillium lecanii (Zimm.) Zare & W. Gams 2001: pathogens of soft scale insects (Coccidae)
 Lecanicillium longisporum (Petch) Zare & W. Gams 2001: pathogens of aphids
 Lecanicillium muscarium (Petch) Zare & W. Gams 2001: pathogens of whiteflies and thrips
 Lecanicillium nodulosum (Petch) Zare & W. Gams 2001
 Lecanicillium pissodis Kope & I. Leal 2006
 Lecanicillium psalliotae (Treschew) Zare & W. Gams 2001
 Lecanicillium saksenae (Kushwaha) Kurihara & Sukarno 2009
 Lecanicillium tenuipes (Petch) Zare & W. Gams 2001
 Lecanicillium wallacei (H.C. Evans) H.C. Evans & Zare 2008

At least 15 products based on Lecanicillium spp. have been, or are in the process of being commercialized as biological pesticides, against a variety of pests in numerous countries worldwide.

References

Biopesticides
Sordariomycetes genera
Cordycipitaceae
Parasitic fungi